Andrew Auguste Etchebarren (June 20, 1943 – October 5, 2019) was an American professional baseball player and minor league manager. A two-time All-Star, Etchebarren also played for the California Angels and the Milwaukee Brewers. After his playing career, he became a coach and managed 16 seasons in the Minor Leagues.

Playing career
Etchebarren was born in Whittier, California of Basque descent. He was signed by the Baltimore Orioles as an amateur free agent in 1961. Expected to be the Orioles' third-string catcher entering his MLB rookie season in 1966, he became the starter in spring training when Dick Brown underwent surgery to remove a brain tumor and Charley Lau injured an elbow in the same timeframe. Etchebarren was the last man to bat against Sandy Koufax when he hit into a double play during the sixth inning of Game 2 of the 1966 World Series. Etchebarren helped the Orioles to win the 1966 and 1970 World Series, 1969 and 1971 AL pennants, and the 1973 and 1974 AL Eastern Division championships.

He was named to the 1966 and 1967 AL All-Star Teams. Etchebarren finished 17th in voting for the 1966 AL MVP for playing in 121 games, having 412 at bats, 49 runs, 91 hits, 14 doubles, 6 triples, 11 home runs, 50 RBI, 38 walks, a .221 batting average, a .293 on-base percentage, a .364 slugging percentage, 150 total bases, 3 sacrifice flies, and 12 intentional walks.

After Etchebarren lost his starting catcher position to Dave Duncan due to injuries during the first week of the 1975 season, his contract was sold by the Orioles to the California Angels at the trade deadline on June 15. He had threatened to retire if he was not sent to his native state of California.

In 15 seasons he played in 948 games and had 2,618 at-bats, 245 runs, 615 hits, 101 doubles, 17 triples, 49 home runs, 309 RBI, 13 stolen bases, 246 walks, .235 batting average, .306 on-base percentage, .343 slugging percentage, 897 total bases, 20 sacrifice hits, 19 sacrifice flies and 41 intentional walks. Defensively, he recorded a .987 fielding percentage.

Managerial career
Etchebarren became the Milwaukee Brewers’ Minor League catching instructor in 1982. He was the Orioles bench coach from 1996 to 1997 under manager Davey Johnson. In 2000 Etchebarren was manager of the Bowie Baysox of the Eastern League, in 2001 and 2002 Rochester Red Wings of the International League. He served as manager of the Aberdeen IronBirds of the New York–Penn League for three seasons until his dismissal from that position on October 22, 2007. He was the manager of the York Revolution of the Atlantic League and led the team to a pair of league championships in 2010 and 2011. He retired from baseball following the 2012 season. The York Revolution announced his death on October 5, 2019, He was 76.

References

External links

Career statistics and player information from Baseball Almanac

1943 births
2019 deaths
Sportspeople from Whittier, California
Baseball players from California
American people of Basque descent
American League All-Stars
Baltimore Orioles coaches
Baltimore Orioles players
California Angels coaches
California Angels players
Major League Baseball bench coaches
Major League Baseball catchers
Milwaukee Brewers coaches
Milwaukee Brewers players
Minor league baseball managers
Aberdeen Pheasants players
Elmira Pioneers players
Lynchburg White Sox players
Rochester Red Wings players
Rochester Red Wings managers